Peter Dobbs (born 20 February 1968) is a New Zealand former cricketer. He played 55 first-class and 34 List A matches for Otago between 1988 and 1995.

Born at Dunedin, Dobbs played under-19 Test and One Day International cricket for New Zealand.

References

External links
 

1968 births
Living people
New Zealand cricketers
Otago cricketers
Cricketers from Dunedin